Haitians (French:) are the citizens of Haiti and the descendants in the diaspora through direct parentage. An ethnonational group, Haitians generally comprise the modern descendants of self-liberated Africans in the Caribbean territory historically referred to as Saint-Domingue. This includes the mulatto minority who denote corresponding European ancestry, notably from French settlers. By virtue of historical distinction, the vast majority of Haitians share and identify with this common African lineage, though a small number are descendants of contemporary immigrants from the Levant who sought refuge in the island nation during World War I and World War II.

Definitions

According to the Constitution of Haiti, a Haitian citizen is:

 Anyone, regardless of where they are born, is considered Haitian if either their mother or father is a native-born citizen of Haiti. A person born in Haiti could automatically receive citizenship.
 A foreigner living in Haiti who has had a continuous period of Haitian residence for five years can apply for citizenship and will have the right to vote, but is not eligible to hold public office until five years after their date of naturalization, excluding those offices reserved for native-born Haitians by Constitutional law.

Dual citizenship
The Haitian Constitution of 2012 re-legalizes dual citizenship, allowing for Haitians living abroad to own land and run for Haitian political office (except for offices of president, prime minister, senator or member of the lower house of Parliament).

Racial groups

Haiti's population is mostly of African descent (5% are of mixed African and other ancestry), though people of many different ethnic and national backgrounds have settled and impacted the country, such as Poles (from Napoleon's Polish legions), Jews, Arabs (from the Arab diaspora), Chinese, Indians, Spanish, Germans (18th century and World War I), Italians, and French, most marrying into the majority black populace and in turn yielding mixed race children (many of whom are prominent in Haitian society).

Languages

The official languages of Haiti are French and Haitian Creole.

Traditionally, the two languages served different functions, with Haitian Creole the informal everyday language of all the people, regardless of social class, and French the language of formal situations: schools, newspapers, the law and the courts, and official documents and decrees. However, because the vast majority of Haitians speak only Creole, there have been efforts in recent years to expand its use. In 1979, a law was passed that permitted Creole to be the language of instruction, and the Constitution of 1983 gave Creole the status of a national language. However, it was only in 1987 that the Constitution granted official status to Creole.

Culture

Art

Haitian art, known for its vibrant color work and expressive design, is a complex tradition, reflecting strong African roots with Indigenous American and European aesthetic and religious influences. It is a very important representation of Haitian culture and history. Haitian art is distinctive, particularly in painting and sculpture where brilliant colors, naive perspective and sly humor characterize it. Frequent subjects in Haitian art include big, delectable foods, lush landscapes, market activities, jungle animals, rituals, dances, and gods. Artists frequently paint in fables.

Music and dance
The music of Haiti combines a wide range of influences drawn from the many people who have settled on this Caribbean island. It reflects French, African rhythms, Spanish elements and others who have inhabited the island of Hispaniola and minor native Taino influences. Youth attend parties at nightclubs called discos, (pronounced "deece-ko"), and attend Bal. This term is the French word for ball, as in a formal dance. Styles of music unique to the nation of Haiti include music derived from Vodou ceremonial traditions and Méringue, Rara parading music, Twoubadou ballads, Mini-jazz rock bands, Rasin movement, Hip hop Kreyòl, and Compas. Compas, short for compas direct, is a complex, ever-changing music that arose from African rhythms and European ballroom dancing, mixed with Haiti's bourgeois culture. It is a refined music, with méringue as its basic rhythm. In Creole, it is spelled as konpa dirèk or simply konpa, however it is commonly spelled as it is pronounced as kompa.

Until 1937, Haiti had no recorded music, until Jazz Guignard was recorded non-commercially. One of the most celebrated Haitian artists today is Wyclef Jean. Wyclef Jean, however, left the country before his teenage years and began the Fugees with Lauryn Hill and Pras, who together went on to become the biggest selling hip hop group of all time with The Score released in 1996.

Cuisine

Haitian cuisine originates from several culinary styles from the various historical ethnic groups that populated the western portion of the island of Hispaniola. Haitian cuisine is similar to the rest of the Latin-Caribbean. Staple Haitian dishes include legim (or legume, typically made with eggplant, chocho, cabbage, carrot, onions, beef, conch, and/or crab), griyo (fried pork), and diri djon djon (aka black rice, a rice dish that gets its black coloring from soaked dried mushroom).

Religion

Haiti is similar to the rest of Latin America, in that it is a predominantly Christian country, with 80% Roman Catholic and approximately 16% professing Protestantism. A small population of Muslims and Hindus exist in the country, principally in the capital of Port-au-Prince.

Vodou, encompassing several different traditions, consists of a mix of Central and Western African, European, and Native American (Taíno) religions, is also widely practiced, despite the negative stigma that it carries both in and out of the country. The exact number of Vodou practitioners is unknown; however, it is believed that a small proportion of the population practice it, often alongside their Christian faith. Some secular Christians also have been known to participate in some rituals, although indirectly.

Migration 
In 1998, a World Bank estimation claimed that approximately 800,000 Haitian citizens were residents of Dominican Republic. By 2001, approximately 15,000 Haitians had migrated to Dominican Republic to work in sugar mills. Haitians workers also migrated to other countries such as the United States, France, Canada, the Bahamas and other Caribbean Islands. In 2006, Approximately 800,000 Haitians resided in the United States (especially in the Miami and New York City areas), 60,000 Haitians were living in France (especially Paris) 40,000 in Canada (especially Montreal) while 80,000 were dispersed between the Bahamas and other Caribbean Islands. The Haitian migration has greatly hindered the development of Haiti in comparison to other countries. Some of the country's most skilled individuals have migrated elsewhere; an estimated 70 percent of Haiti's skilled human resources have left Haiti. In the 2010 U.S. Census, 907,790 citizens identified as Haitian immigrants or with their primary ancestry being Haitian. An increase of just over 100,000 Haitians from 2006. The confiscation of property, massacres, and prosecution caused the upper and middle class of Haiti to migrate to more developed countries in Europe and the United States.

Haitians

See also

 Haitian diaspora
 Afro-Haitians
 Mulatto Haitians
 White Haitians
 Indo-Haitians
 Arab Haitians
 Chinese Haitians
 Italian Haitians
 French Haitians
 Haitian Mexicans
 Haitian Americans
 Haitian Brazilian
 Haitian Canadians

References

Further reading

 
Creole peoples
Ethnic groups in Haiti